The 2015 Landstede Brose Tournament was a friendly exhibition basketball tournament held in the Landstede Sportcentrum in Zwolle on September 19 and September 20, 2015. The tournament is sponsored by Brose Fahrzeugteile.

Participants

Semifinals

Final

Third place

References

2015–16 in Dutch basketball
2015–16 in Turkish basketball
2015–16 in German basketball
International basketball competitions hosted by the Netherlands